Captain Charles Jones, 5th Viscount Ranelagh (29 October 1761–20 December 1800) was a British Royal Navy officer and Irish peer of the late-eighteenth century who served on the Ireland station in  but died aged 39 from an illness during his military service.

Naval career
The son of Charles Wilkinson Jones, 4th Viscount Ranelagh and his wife Sarah Montgomery (daughter of Irish politician Thomas Montgomery), Jones was raised in Dublin and attended Trinity College, Dublin before joining the Royal Navy.

Jones was appointed in 1795 to HMS Doris and attached to the Irish station during the French Revolutionary Wars. Fraternité was the flagship of the French attempt to invade Bantry Bay and by driving her off, the invasion force was left leaderless and was dispersed and defeated piecemeal. Later in the year, on 20 April 1797, Jones inherited the viscountcy from his deceased father and became Lord Ranelagh.

In 1798, Doris was again involved in foiling a French attempt to invade Ireland, forming part of a squadron under Sir John Borlase Warren. Doris was detached in early October to search the Donegal coast for French ships however and so missed the Battle of Tory Island in which the French invasion force was defeated and dispersed. Two years later, Doris was in Plymouth Sound when Lord Ranelagh died from a sudden illness. His titles were passed to his younger brother Thomas Jones.

Notes

References

Royal Navy officers
Royal Navy personnel of the French Revolutionary Wars
1761 births
1800 deaths
Alumni of Trinity College Dublin
Viscounts in the Peerage of Ireland
Military personnel from Dublin (city)